Sakhi (Gurmukhi: ਸਾਖੀ; sākhī) literally means 'historical account', 'anecdote', or 'story'. It is derived from the Sanskrit word sākṣī (साक्षी) which literally means 'witness'.

The term refers to the accounts of the historical events in Sikhism. It is a tale usually from the era during the times of the Gurus. However, many Sakhis do exist from the period before and after the times of the Ten Gurus. Most Sakhis have a moral lesson and highlight important Sikh principles.

Below is a list of important Sakhis with a message for Sikhs.

Featured Sakhis

Other Sakhis

References

Further reading

External links
 www.sikh-history.com
 www.sikhpoint.com

Modern Stories
 www.searchsikhism.com

See Also:
 Sau Sakhi

Sikh terminology